Worlds Apart may refer to:

Film and television

Films
Worlds Apart (1921 film), an American silent film starring Eugene O'Brien
Worlds Apart (2008 film), a Danish film by Niels Arden Oplev
Worlds Apart, a 2008 Israeli film by Amos Kollek, based on his novel Don't Ask Me If I Love
Worlds Apart (2015 film), a Greek film by Christoforos Papakaliatis

Television
Survivor: Worlds Apart, the 30th season of the US reality competition Survivor
Worlds Apart with Oksana Boyko, a program on RT

Episodes
"Worlds Apart" (Falling Skies)
"Worlds Apart" (Fringe)
"Worlds Apart" (The Outer Limits)
"Worlds Apart" (Private Practice)
"Worlds Apart" (Swamp Thing)
"Worlds Apart" (Voyagers!)

Literature
 Rick and Morty – Worlds Apart, a 2021 graphic novel by Josh Trujillo
 Worlds Apart (novel), a 1983 novel by Joe Haldeman
 Worlds Apart: A Dialogue of the 1960s, a 1963 book by Owen Barfield

Music
Worlds Apart (band), a 1990s English boy band

Albums
 Worlds Apart (Allen/Olzon album) or the title song, 2020
Worlds Apart (...And You Will Know Us by the Trail of Dead album) or the title song, 2005
Worlds Apart (Blackjack album), 1980
Worlds Apart (Conquest album), 1999
Worlds Apart (Horizon album), 2004
Worlds Apart (Make Them Suffer album), 2017
Worlds Apart (Saga album), 1981
Worlds Apart (Soleil Moon album) or the title song, 2000
Worlds Apart (Subhumans album), 1985

EPs
Worlds Apart (Betty Who EP), 2014
Worlds Apart (The Go-Betweens EP), 2005
Worlds Apart (Seven Lions EP) or the title song, 2014

Songs
"Worlds Apart" (Vince Gill song), 1996
"Worlds Apart", by Bruce Springsteen from The Rising, 2002
"Worlds Apart", by Cock Robin from First Love Last Rites, 1989
"Worlds Apart", by Go Comet!, a side project of Ilan Kidron, 2014
"Worlds Apart", by Jars of Clay from Jars of Clay, 1995
"Worlds Apart", by Silverstein from Arrivals & Departures, 2007
"Worlds Apart", by the Sinceros from The Sound of Sunbathing, 1979
"Separate Ways (Worlds Apart)", by Journey from Frontiers, 1983

Video games
Doctor Who: Worlds Apart, a 2021 blockchain digital collectible card game based on the science-fiction series Doctor Who